Afurca (Tat: Afurcə) is a village and municipality in the Quba Rayon of Azerbaijan.  It has a population of 819.  The municipality consists of the villages of Afurca, Atuc, Ruçuq, and Fırıq.

References

External links

Populated places in Quba District (Azerbaijan)